Vincent Corazza (born December 6, 1972) is a Canadian actor, known for playing the role of Alden Jones in the television series Braceface and Darien Shields/Tuxedo Mask in the anime Sailor Moon.

Career
Corazza began acting at the age of 10. His credits include the 2003 feature film, Owning Mahowny as well as the television movie The Cheetah Girls for the Disney Channel. Other credits include guest appearances on The Famous Jett Jackson, 24, CSI: Crime Scene Investigation, JAG and Without a Trace, and a December 2006 appearance on the daytime drama General Hospital.

Notable vocal/animation credits include Alden on Braceface, Tuxedo Mask (CWi dub) and Alan (DiC dub) of Sailor Moon, Sam Sparks of Rescue Heroes and Shickadance of Ace Ventura: Pet Detective. He was also the voice of U.B.C.S. mercenary Carlos Oliveira in the PlayStation video game Resident Evil 3: Nemesis, and the voice of Zexion in Kingdom Hearts Re:Chain of Memories and Kingdom Hearts 358/2 Days.

Corazza played the lead animated character of "Slim" in an IMAX feature entitled Adventures in Animation 3D.

Corazza also had a role in the horror movie Bless the Child.

Corazza acted as Harry Bright on the US National tour of Mamma Mia!, and also was a part of the original Broadway production of Rocky in 2014. In 2015, he took on the role of male lead in Music Theater of Wichita's stage adaptation of Big Fish (July, 2015). Corazza plays the part of Edward Bloom, a father who raised his son on fantastic and exaggerated stories.

Filmography

Film

Television
 The Famous Jett Jackson as Plunkett
 24 as Tyler (2 episodes)
 CSI: Crime Scene Investigation as Car Rental Representative (Episode: "Grissom Versus the Volcano")
 JAG as P.O. Jimmy Bingham
 Without a Trace as Chuck Whiting (Episode: "Gung-Ho")
 Adventure Inc. as Logan Kincaid (Episode: "Message from the Deep")
 TekWar as Michael Del Amo (Episode: "Deep Cover")
 Due South as Lenny (Episode: "Vault")
 Braceface as Alden Jones (voice)
 Sailor Moon as Darien Shields/Tuxedo Mask, Alan (voices)
 Rescue Heroes as Sam Sparks (voice)
 Ace Ventura: Pet Detective as Shickadance (voice)
 Mythic Warriors: Guardians of the Legend as Cilix, Suitor (voices)
 Beyblade as Steve, Robert Jurgen/Gustav (voices)
 What's New, Scooby-Doo? as Zeke Zillion (voice) (Episode: "Simple Plan and the Invisible Madman")
 F/X: The Series as Quinn Proffet (Episode: "Bad Influence")
 Eerie, Indiana: The Other Dimension as Armondo (Episode: "Standard Deviation")
 Nothing Too Good for a Cowboy as Drunken Cowboy
 Total Recall 2070 as James Tate
 PSI Factor: Chronicles of the Paranormal as Calvin Finch (Episode: "Tribunal")
 La Femme Nikita as Boris (Episode: "I Remember Paris"), Prisoner (Episode: "Threshold of Pain")
 Traders as John Mills (Episode: "The Running of the Bulls")
 Haven as Cody
 The Guardian as John Feeney
 Earth: Final Conflict as Combs (Episode: "Unearthed"), Rick (Episode: "Bliss")
 MythQuest as Giacomo (Episode: "The Doppelganger")
 Soul Food as James (2 episodes)
 Line of Fire as James Lawson (Episode: "The Best-Laid Plans")
 American Dreams as Mike (Episode: "Tidings of Comfort and Joy")
 NYPD Blue as Det. Ray Quinn (Episode: "Moving Day")
 Strong Medicine as Dino Benedetti (Episode: "Rhythm of the Heart")
 Stargate SG-1 as Worrel (Episode: "Off the Grid")
 Lie to me as Deputy Whitmore (Episode: "Moral Waiver")
 The Young and the Restless as Agent Nolan Grimes (Episode 9194)
 Entourage as Manager #1 (Episode: No More Drama)
 Supah Ninjas as Mallini the Magnificent (Episode: The Magnificent)

Video game roles

References

External links
 
 Official Website
 

1972 births
Living people
Canadian male film actors
Canadian male stage actors
Canadian male television actors
Canadian male video game actors
Canadian male voice actors
Male actors from Ontario
People from Newmarket, Ontario
20th-century Canadian male actors
21st-century Canadian male actors